Dora Kanabahita Byamukama is a Ugandan politician, lawyer, advocate and legislator. She is an elected member of the East African Legislative Assembly for the period June 2012 through June 2017. She previously served the Mwenge South constituency as a member of the Parliament of Uganda.

She holds two degrees from Makerere University and is considered an international expert in law, social justice and development.

References

Living people
Ugandan women lawyers
Members of the Parliament of Uganda
Women members of the Parliament of Uganda
Members of the East African Legislative Assembly
Makerere University alumni
Year of birth missing (living people)
Place of birth missing (living people)